Ahmed Hassanein Pasha, KCVO, MBE (31 October 1889 – 19 February 1946) or Aḥmad Moḥammad Makhlūf Ḥasanēn al-Būlākī was an Egyptian courtier, diplomat, politician, and geographic explorer. Hassanein was the tutor, Chief of the Diwan and Chamberlain to Farouk, the king of Egypt from 1936 to 1952, and also represented Egypt in the 1924 Summer Olympics in fencing.

Early life
Hassanein was born in 1889, the son of an Al-Azhar University professor, and grandson of the last Admiral of the Egyptian fleet before it was dismantled under British occupation in 1882. He studied at Balliol College of Oxford University.

Tutor
King Fuad I, father of Farouk, chose Hassanein to tutor the Crown Prince during the Prince's studies as a teenager in London. While Fuad spoke Turkish as his mother-tongue and was therefore unable to eloquently address his own nation, Farouk learned to speak Arabic proficiently under Hassanein's coaching.

Expeditions 

During an expedition through the Libyan Desert in 1923, Ahmed Hassanein crossed a region defended by the puritanical Senussis.

In December 1922, Hassanein began a new scientific expedition from Sallum. He recorded bearings and measures of distances, took photos, samples, wrote his journal, and interacted with his men to learn more about their traditions and places and natural phenomena. He corrected the position of his destination of Kufra on maps, and at the climax of his expedition discovered previously unknown water sources, the "Lost Oases" of Jebel Uweinat and Jebel Arkenu, which opened new Sahara routes from Kufra to Sudanic Africa. The latter was known since 1892 through Arab sources,. During the journey he took photographs of significant rock art.

In September 1924, his report was published in the National Geographic Magazine with 47 photos and a map. His book, The Lost Oases, was published the following year in English and later in Arabic and German.

Ahmed's work based on his journeys includes: an accurate map of a then-unknown region, based on astro-fixing and triangulation techniques; writings on the history and traditions of the isolated and fiercely independent Senussis sect in Libya; a published memoir; a geological collection; and thousands of photos and hours of footage. He was honoured with the title of Bey and the Founder's Medal of the British Royal Geographical Society in 1924.

Olympics
Hassanein competed at the 1920 and 1924 Summer Olympics in the foil and épée competitions.

Hassanein mausoleum

Ahmed Hassanein was killed in an automobile accident on 19 February 1946 and was buried in the Mameluke Northern Cemetery across the Salah Salem road from the new seat of the Al-Azhar Imam in a mausoleum built by his brother-in-law, the architect Hassan Fathy.

Sources

References

External links
 Definitive brief biography of Ahmed Hassanein: Introduction by Michael Haag to The Lost Oases by Ahmed Hassanein, The American University in Cairo Press, Cairo and New York, 2006
 The complete text and photos of his National Geographic Magazine article, September 1924
 Ahmed Hassanein biography

1889 births
1946 deaths
Alumni of Balliol College, Oxford
Egyptian courtiers
Egyptian explorers
Egyptian male épée fencers
Egyptian pashas
19th-century Egyptian people
Egyptian photographers
Egyptian writers
Explorers of Africa
Explorers of the Libyan Desert
Fellows of the Royal Geographical Society
Fencers at the 1920 Summer Olympics
Fencers at the 1924 Summer Olympics
Knights Commander of the Royal Victorian Order
Members of the Order of the British Empire
Motorcycle road incident deaths
Road incident deaths in Egypt
Olympic fencers of Egypt
Sportspeople from Cairo
Egyptian male foil fencers
Fellows of the American Physical Society